Francesco Maria Sforza (30 January 1491 – 1512), nicknamed il Duchetto ("The Little Duke"), was the only son of Gian Galeazzo Sforza, the sixth Duke of Milan, and his wife, Isabella of Naples. After the untimely death in 1494 of Francesco's father at the age of 25, his father's uncle, Ludovico Sforza, took over as Duke of Milan.

Francesco was Count of Pavia from 1491 to 1499. In the latter year, as French troops conquered Milan during the Italian War of 1499–1504, he was carried to France by King Louis XII.

Francesco died falling from a horse at Angoulême in 1512.

See also
Italian Wars

1491 births
1512 deaths
Francesco Duchetto
16th-century Italian nobility
Deaths by horse-riding accident in France
Sons of monarchs